Robillard may refer to:

 Robillard (surname)
 Robillard Glacier, Antarctica
 Presqu'île-Robillard Ecological Reserve, Argenteuil, Quebec, Canada
 Complexe sportif Claude-Robillard, a multi-purpose sports facility in Montreal, Quebec
 Robillard Block, Montreal, Quebec, Canada, a building that held the first cinema in Canada